Gunnar Johnsen  (28 May 1924 – 10 February 2001) was a Norwegian journalist and politician.

He was born in Oslo to Trygve Johnsen and Bergljot Johannessen. He was elected representative to the Storting for the period 1973–1977 for the Conservative Party. From 1977 to 1993 he was chief editor of the newspaper Drammens Tidende & Buskeruds Blad.

References

1924 births
2001 deaths
Journalists from Oslo
Conservative Party (Norway) politicians
Members of the Storting
Norwegian newspaper editors
Politicians from Oslo